Friends of the Soviet Union was an organization in Norway, promoting relations with the Soviet Union. The organization was founded in 1928. It worked closely with the Communist Party of Norway.

Adam Egede-Nissen was chairman of the organization 1933-1935. From 1935 to 1940, Nordahl Grieg was chairman of the organization.

The organization, along with the Communist Party, was banned under the German occupation on August 16, 1940.

References

Soviet Union friendship associations
Norway friendship associations
Norway–Soviet Union relations
1928 establishments in Norway
Organizations established in 1928